Craig Smith is an Australian former professional rugby league footballer who played for the North Queensland Cowboys in the National Rugby League.

Playing career
Smith played for the Wests Panthers in the Queensland Cup from 1996 to 2000. In 1998, he started at centre in the Panthers' 16–35 loss to the Norths Devils in the Grand Final.

In Round 26 of the 1999 NRL season, due to a partnership between Wests and the North Queensland Cowboys, Smith made his NRL debut off the bench in the Cowboys
18–28 loss to the North Sydney Bears (which was North Sydney's final first grade game).

In 2000, he returned to the Wests Panthers before joining Elite One Championship club Lézignan Sangliers in 2001. In 2015, he was named on the wing in the Wests Panthers Team of the 1990s by rugby league historian Mike Higgison.

Statistics

NRL
 Statistics are correct to the end of the 1999 season

References

Living people
Australian rugby league players
North Queensland Cowboys players
Lézignan Sangliers players
Rugby league wingers
Rugby league centres
Rugby league players from Brisbane
Year of birth missing (living people)
Wests Panthers players